María Lourdes Caldera Méndez is a pageant titleholder, was born in Maracaibo, Venezuela on January 24, 1983, and grew up in Caracas, Venezuela. She is the Miss Turismo Venezuela (Miss Tourism Venezuela) titleholder for 2007, and was the official representative of Venezuela to the Miss Tourism Queen International pageant held in  Zhengzhou, China on April 10, 2008; when she won the Best Evening Gown award. She was represented the Distrito Capital in the Miss Venezuela 2008 pageant, on September 10, 2008, but unplaced.

References

External links
Miss Venezuela Official Website
Miss Tourism Queen International Official Website
Miss Turismo Venezuela Official Website

1983 births
Living people
People from Maracaibo
Venezuelan female models